The 1940 Cork Senior Football Championship was the 52nd staging of the Cork Senior Football Championship since its establishment by the Cork County Board in 1887. The draw for the opening round fixtures took place on 28 January 1940. The championship began on 31 March 1940 and ended on 15 September 1940.

Clonakilty were the defending champions, however, they were beaten by Beara at the quarter-final stage.

On 15 September 1940, Beara won the championship following a 2-08 to 1-07 defeat of Millstreet in the final at Skibbereen Town Park. This was their fourth championship title overall and their first title since 1934.

Results

First round

 Millstreet received a bye in this round.

Quarter-finals

Semi-finals

Final

Championship statistics

Miscellaneous
 Beara win their first title since 1934.
 Millstreet qualify for the final for the first time.
 Avondhu objected to Collins fielding a team, however, this objection was rejected. In spite of this, Collins withdrew from the championship.

References

Cork Senior Football Championship